Blue is the sixth and final full-length album by The Jesus Lizard, released in 1998. Produced by Andy Gill, it is something of a departure for The Jesus Lizard, exploring some of the more experimental instincts hinted at on earlier songs like "Happy Bunny Goes Fluff-Fluff Along" on Pure. It is one of only two releases by the band to feature new drummer Jim Kimball, the other being the self-titled EP released two months prior. A limited edition vinyl pressing was released on Jetset Records on April 21, 1998. The album was released in Canada only by Sonic Unyon Records under license from Capitol Records in the USA after EMI Canada passed on releasing the album.

Track listing 
All tracks composed by the Jesus Lizard
 "I Can Learn" – 3:10
 "Horse Doctor Man" – 3:58
 "Eucalyptus" – 5:59
 "A Tale of Two Women" – 3:28
 "Cold Water" – 2:45
 "And Then the Rain" – 3:13
 "Postcoital Glow" – 3:31
 "Until It Stopped to Die" – 3:56
 "Soft Damage" – 4:05
 "Happy Snakes" – 3:00
 "Needles for Teeth (Version)" – 3:40
 "Terremoto" – 1:20

Personnel 
The Jesus Lizard
David Yow - vocals
Duane Denison - guitar, keyboards
David Sims - bass, keyboards
Jim Kimball - drums
Technical
 Andy Gill - producer, mixing
 Jeff Lane - engineer, mixing
 Ron Lowe - engineer
 Joe Barresi - mixing
 Howie Weinberg - mastering

References 

1998 albums
The Jesus Lizard albums
Capitol Records albums
Albums produced by Andy Gill